Carlo Barone (born in Vigevano in 1955- 2022) is a classical guitarist and conductor specializing in the performance practice of 19th-century music, especially 19th-century guitar works.

He is director of the Accademia "l'Ottocento" (Academy of Nineteenth-Century Music) a non-profit Association active since 1982, in Italy and France; which documents and publishes original 19th-century musical material and researches the performance practice of this musical era. Carlo Barone conducts international courses, masterclasses and lectures on the interpretation of 19th-century musical works, e.g. by composers such as Mauro Giuliani and Fernando Sor.

Barone is the conductor of Orchestra dell’Accademia l’Ottocento which performs on original classical period instruments.

As a performer Barone uses historical period guitars by luthiers such as Guadagnini, Soriot, Garganese, Lacôte, etc.

References

External links
Biography  (accademia800.org)
Biography (goldbergweb.com)

Recordings
Mauro Giuliani – Luigi Moretti (RUS  552053.2, Rugginenti Editions, Milan) - performed on an 1828 guitar by Gaetano Guadagnini

Publications
Anatomia e fisiologia dell'esecuzione chitarristica A.G.I.F., Vigevano (1998)

1955 births
Italian classical guitarists
Italian male guitarists
Italian male conductors (music)
People from Vigevano
Living people
21st-century Italian conductors (music)
21st-century Italian male musicians